Cirripectes chelomatus, the Lady Musgrave blenny, is a species of combtooth blenny found in coral reefs in the western Pacific ocean.  This species reaches a length of  TL.

References

chelomatus
Taxa named by Jeffrey T. Williams
Taxa named by André L. Maugé
Fish described in 1984